Sigma Theta Psi is a multicultural, academic, and social sorority. The sorority was founded at San Jose State University (SJSU) in 1991. Sigma Theta Psi is known for their significant contribution to breast cancer awareness throughout sisters' local campuses and communities and even nationwide.

History
The Founding Mothers of Sigma Theta Psi created the sorority on November 13, 1991 at San Jose State University. Over time, the sorority expanded and now has 13 chapters.

Chapters
Sigma Theta Psi has placed 14 chapters at universities and colleges in California and Nevada, six of which are inactive.  Active chapters are noted in bold, inactive chapters by italics.

Sorority information
Sigma Theta Psi's colors are purple, black, and gold. Its mascot is a black panther and its flower is an orchid. Each year, chapters organize multicultural, social, and academic events ranging from step shows to guest speakers to professional development events.

Since Sigma Theta Psi is also an academic sorority, members are required to maintain a minimum grade point average (GPA). Thus, each member's primary focus should be on their academic studies.

The sorority's national philanthropy is breast cancer awareness. Their current beneficiary is the American Cancer Society.  Sigma Theta Psi's annual event to raise money for this organization and local organizations is their Double D Brunch.  This event is a national luncheon hosted in both California and Nevada.

References

External links
National Website

Student societies in the United States
Student organizations established in 1991
1991 establishments in California